Trash Hit is the debut studio album by American post-punk band Mr. Dream, released on March 1, 2011 by Godmode Records.

Track listing

Personnel
Adam Moerder - Songwriter, guitarist, vocals
Matt Morello - Vocals, bass guitar
Nick Sylvester - Songwriter, drums, producer

References

2011 debut albums
Mr. Dream albums